Gheorghe Maftei (born 7 April 1939) is a Romanian bobsledder. He competed at the 1964 Winter Olympics and the 1968 Winter Olympics.

References

1939 births
Living people
Romanian male bobsledders
Olympic bobsledders of Romania
Bobsledders at the 1964 Winter Olympics
Bobsledders at the 1968 Winter Olympics
People from Iași County